"The Wang Dang Taffy-Apple Tango" was a pop song, written by J. Leslie McFarland and Aaron Schroeder, and sung by Pat Boone.  It was released in 1959 as a B-side, on the single "For a Penny".  In 1959, it reached No. 63 on the Billboard Hot 100.

Track listing

References

1959 songs
Pat Boone songs
Songs written by Aaron Schroeder
Songs written by John Leslie McFarland